Ricardo Ramos known as Ricardo Vila (born 5 December 1980) is a Brazilian footballer who plays for Atlético Sorocaba (as of April 2011).

He spent most of his career in the second division of São Paulo state, but also briefly played in national Série B and Série C in 2007 season.

Biography
Born in Taubaté, São Paulo state, Ricardo Vila spent most of his career inside the state. He was transferred to Indonesian side Persebaya in 2004 and returned to Brazil a year later. He played for Guaratinguetá in 2005 Campeonato Paulista Série A2 and Oeste in 2005 Copa Paulista de Futebol, finished as the losing side in round of 16.

In 2006, he left for Guaratinguetá, finished as the losing semi-finalists of Paulista Série A2 and promoted. He spent second half of year in União São João along with former Guaratinguetá teammate Júnior Paulista, for 2006 Copa Paulista. The team finished as the losing quarter-finalists.

In 2007, he was signed by Grêmio Barueri in 1-year contract. After played once on 18 May, in June he was loaned to Paraná state football club Roma de Apucarana until the end of 2007 Série C. After Roma was eliminated in the second stage, he returned to Grêmio Barueri in September. He only missed one game (the last match of stage one) for Roma.

In 2008, he was signed by São José (SP). The team finished as the 9th in 2008 Paulista Série A2 and 19th in 2008 Copa Paulista.

In 2009, he was transferred to Monte Azul, rejoining Júnior Paulista. The team won 2009 Paulista Série A2 and promoted. He was transferred to Linense in July 2009. The team finished as losing quarter-finalists in the cup and winning 2010 Paulista Série A2 along with Júnior Paulista. He was released in May.

In November 2010 he joined Atlético Sorocaba until the end of 2011 Paulista Série A2.

Honours
 Campeonato Paulista Série A2: 2009 (Monte Azul), 2010 (Linense)

References

External links
 

Brazilian footballers
Grêmio Barueri Futebol players
Guaratinguetá Futebol players
Oeste Futebol Clube players
União São João Esporte Clube players
Roma Esporte Apucarana players
São José Esporte Clube players
Atlético Monte Azul players
Clube Atlético Linense players
Clube Atlético Sorocaba players
Association football central defenders
Brazilian expatriate footballers
Expatriate footballers in Indonesia
Brazilian expatriate sportspeople in Indonesia
Footballers from São Paulo (state)
1980 births
Living people